The olive-striped flycatcher (Mionectes galbinus) is a species of bird in the family Tyrannidae.

It is found in Bolivia, Colombia, Ecuador, Panama, Peru, Trinidad and Tobago, and Venezuela.

Its natural habitats are subtropical or tropical moist lowland forests, subtropical or tropical moist montane forests, and heavily degraded former forest.

References

Mionectes
Birds of Panama
Birds of Colombia
Birds of Venezuela
Birds of Ecuador
Birds of Peru
Birds of Trinidad and Tobago
Birds described in 1902
Taxonomy articles created by Polbot